Zorgdragerfjorden is a fjord at the northern coast of Nordaustlandet, Svalbard, west of Platenhalvøya, in Prins Oscars Land. The fjord is named after Dutch captain .

References

Fjords of Svalbard
Nordaustlandet